Jämtlands Flyg AB was a Swedish helicopter company that specialised in aerial and charter work. It operated out of the main heliport Göviken in the city of Östersund, in Jämtland County. Jämtlands Flyg AB was a member of the Swedish Association of Aviation Companies (SFR) and a purveyor to the Court of Sweden.

History
The company was founded in 1954 by the mountain-aviator Gunnar Andersson. At first, operations were solely by seaplanes. The company also ran cabins in the mountains for mainly fishing tourists and grouse hunters. Later these were sold off and rotor-wing aircraft took over entirely.

Andersson died in a plane crash in 1974. Later his daughter Siw A. Grinde took over as CEO in 1981 and ran the company until his granddaughter Sara Grinde took over as CEO in 2007. The company ceased all operations in 2019.

Operations
 Fire-fighting/water bombing
 Herding of reindeer
 Inspection of power lines and forest
 Taxi/V.I.P.
 Game darting
 Game inventory
 Heavy lifting
 Precision lifting
 Snow radar measuring
 Supervision for Swedish government and law enforcement agencies
 Water sampling
 Photography and filming
 Parachuting

Fleet
Jämtlands Flyg AB operated seven helicopters.

Bases
Bases with heli-ports and hangars were in use at the following locations:

See also
 Airlines
 Transport in Sweden

References

External links

 Company's official homepage (archive)

Companies based in Jämtland County
Aerospace companies
Defunct airlines of Sweden
Defunct helicopter airlines
Airlines established in 1954
Purveyors to the Court of Sweden
1954 establishments in Sweden